Jostens is an American manufacturer of memorabilia. The company is primarily known for its production of yearbooks and class rings for various high schools and colleges as well as championship rings for sports. Jostens also produced photobook products for Disney's PhotoPass photography service offered at Disney theme parks and resorts.

As well as its headquarters near Minneapolis and operational offices in Owatonna, Minn., Jostens has facilities in Clarksville, Tenn.; Denton, Texas; Eagan, Minn.; Laurens, S.C.; Sedalia, Mo.; Shelbyville, Tenn.; the Dominican Republic; and Mexico.

History 
Otto Josten founded the company as a watch-repair business in Owatonna in 1897. Jostens (then called "Josten's" — the apostrophe was later dropped) began manufacturing emblems and awards for nearby schools and in 1906, the year of incorporation, Josten added class rings to his product line, to be sold to schools throughout the Midwest. Jostens created the American Yearbook Company in 1950, later merging it under the Jostens brand.

On October 14, 2015, Jarden acquired Jostens from Visant Corporation, stating that it planned to take advantage of synergies with its other properties (particularly Rawlings and Yankee Candle), and "turn it into a true consumer-product business, as opposed to it historically being run like a printing asset".

Jarden merged with Newell Rubbermaid in 2016 to form Newell Brands. In 2018, Newell Brands sold Jostens to Platinum Equity for $1.3 billion.

Products
Jostens is the primary supplier of Super Bowl rings, and has made 31 champion rings in the Super Bowl's 50-year history .

In April 2015, Jostens launched the world's first Adobe InDesign streaming partnership with Adobe Inc., called "Monarch," at the Journalism Education Association spring convention in Denver.

See also
 L.G. Balfour Company

References

External links
 

Companies based in Minneapolis
Design companies established in 1897
Jewelry companies of the United States
Printing companies of the United States
Publishing companies of the United States
Private equity portfolio companies
Yearbooks
Manufacturing companies established in 1897
1897 establishments in Minnesota
Publishing companies established in 1897
2015 mergers and acquisitions
2016 mergers and acquisitions
2018 mergers and acquisitions